Alsophila colensoi, also known as the creeping tree fern, mountain tree fern and golden tree fern, is a species of tree fern native to
New Zealand, from the southern part of the North Island south to Stewart Island. It grows in submontane to montane forest in damp areas, particularly near the tree line. The trunk is usually prostrate, but may sometimes be erect. It may reach about 1 m in height. Fronds are tripinnate and about 1.5 m long or more. The rachis and stipe are slender, pale brown and are covered with brown scales. Sori occur in two rows, one along each side of the fertile pinnule midvein, and lack indusia. Plants form a thicket with no sign of a trunk.

In cultivation, this species requires rich humus, good shade and much moisture. Being a montane plant, it does well in cooler regions.

The specific epithet colensoi commemorates William Colenso (1811-1899), a missionary and New Zealand botanist.

References

colensoi
Flora of New Zealand
Plants described in 1854
Taxa named by Joseph Dalton Hooker